Wa$ted! is an American reality series which ran on Planet Green and was hosted by Annabelle Gurwitch and Holter Graham. It originated from a television show from New Zealand by the same name.

Six episodes were shown on TLC before the show was moved to Planet Green. Some people got confused about the original airdate of those six episodes because they were rearranged with the final four episodes of the first season.

Format
The show opens with the hosts giving the family or business an overview of their wasteful life and returning to them months worth of their own trash. They then have to sort through it and are shown all the hazardous, recyclable, and reusable items they have wasted. Next they examine the house and point out faults such as heating, aging machines, lights and televisions being on, automobiles, and water use among other things.

Based on all this, an ecological footprint is created to show how many acres it takes to sustain the household. The hosts then help the family or business implement greener alternatives and change their wasteful habits. They also promise to match the amount that they save in utilities and the like by projecting the totals forward for one year.

The family or business is given three weeks to change their habits. Afterward, they are evaluated on how well they did, given a new footprint based on their new habits, and awarded money equal to their energy savings.

Episodes

Series overview

Season 1 (2008)

Season 2 (2009)

Season 3 (2010)

References

External links
 
 Official Website

2008 American television series debuts
2000s American reality television series
2010s American reality television series
2010 American television series endings
English-language television shows
TLC (TV network) original programming
Destination America original programming